A Pandit (also spelled Pundit, pronounced ; abbreviated Pt.) is an individual with specialised knowledge or a teacher of any field of knowledge whether it is shashtra (Holy Books) or shastra (Weapons) in Hinduism, particularly the Vedic scriptures, dharma, or Hindu philosophy; in colonial-era literature, the term generally refers to Brahmins specialized in Hindu law. Whereas, today the title is used for experts in other subjects, such as music.  Pundit is an English loanword meaning "an expert in a particular subject or field who is frequently called upon to give their opinions to the public".

Ustad is the equivalent title for a Muslim man in the musical sense. The equivalent titles for a Hindu woman are Vidushi, Pandita, or Panditain; however, these titles are not currently in widespread use.

In Sanskrit, pandit generally refers to any "wise, educated or learned man" with specialized knowledge. The term is found in Vedic and post-Vedic texts, but without any sociological context.

Pandit as a title in Hindustani classical music
Pandit (abbreviated as Pt. and written as / in Marathi/Hindi) is an honorific title for an expert person in Indian classical singing and instrumental playing, used for an Indian musician. It is used in Hindustani classical music to recognize master performers for classical singing and other performing arts, like classical dance. It is used as a Music Title. The title is awarded to musicians by their teachers, prominent individuals, or members of their gharana in recognition of their expertise. It is used in various languages including Marathi, Hindi, Bengali, Punjabi and other languages which are there in India. An Indian woman, who is an expert in Indian classical music, is given the title of pandita or vidushi. Ustad is the equivalent title for a Muslim man.

Usage
Titles of pandit (and even ustad) are appended informally to the names of classical singers and players by their admirers, individuals or institutions, once they have reached eminence in their performing art, especially on public performances. As they are informal titles, mentioning names of eminent singers without those appendages is ok, unlike prefixes like Dr. awarded formally by educational institutions.

The title pandit of a classical musician and the pandit which is used as a title given to a knowledgeable person, is different.

There are many pandits in Hindustani classical music, for example, Pandit Jasraj, Pandit Ravi Shankar, Bhimsen Joshi, Pandit Kumar Gandharva, Pandit Guru Jnan Prakash Ghosh, Pandit Nikhil Ghosh, Pandit Nayan Ghosh, Pandit Anindo Chatterjee, Pandit Hariprasad Chaurasia, Taalyogi Pandit Suresh Talwalkar, Pandit Yogesh Samsi, Pandit Vyenkatesh Kumar, Pandit Birju Maharaj, Pandit Kishan Maharaj, Pandit Ulhas Kashalkar, Pandit Swapan Chaudhuri, Pandit Kaivalya Kumar Gurav, Pandit Shankar Ghosh, Pandit V.G. Jog, etc.

Synonym
As ustad is equivalent to pandit but used for a Muslim man, similarly a music title that is equivalent to pandit and used for an Indian man itself is given the title of Vidwan. Generally this title is given to a male Carnatic classical singer or instrument player. One prominent example is Vidwan Thetakudi Harihara Vinayakram.

For a woman Carnatic classical singer or instrument player, the title of Vidushi is given.

Equivalent titles for an Indian woman are Vidushi or Pandita. Some examples are, Vidushi Kishori Amonkar, Vidushi Prabha Atre, Vidushi Gangubai Hangal, Vidushi Padma Talwalkar, Vidushi Veena Sahasrabuddhe, Vidushi Aruna Sairam, Vidushi Ashwini Bhide-Deshpande, Vidushi Kaushiki Chakraborty, Vidushi Anuradha Pal,  Vidushi Mita Nag, etc.

Kashmiri surname
Pandit is a Kashmiri Pandit clan and surname native to the Kashmir Valley of Jammu and Kashmir, India. 'Pandit' as a last name is used by both Kashmiri Hindus and Kashmiri Muslim of Hindu lineage.

See also
  Pundit
  Pujari
 Ustad
 Purohit – a house priest

References

External links

Hindustani music
Honorifics
Indian music
Men's social titles
Indian surnames
Hindu surnames
Kashmiri tribes
Kashmiri-language surnames
Titles and occupations in Hinduism